Brooke Ashley Lyons (born November 8, 1980) is an American actress. She is known for her roles as Amy in the 2008 film Welcome Home Roscoe Jenkins and as Peach Landis in the CBS sitcom 2 Broke Girls.

Early life and education
Lyons was born in Washington, D.C. She is the daughter of surgeon James R. Lyons and dancer Penny A. Lyons (née Sousa). She is of Italian, Irish and Portuguese descent and grew up in Fairfield and New Haven, Connecticut, and several other towns in the state. She spent a lot of her youth both dancing and riding horses, giving up the latter to focus on the former.

As a child she suffered from scoliosis, which prevented her from a pursuing a career as a ballet dancer. Before being diagnosed, she studied dance at the Joffrey Ballet School, the New England Ballet School in Connecticut, the Boston Ballet and traveled to France. She wore a back brace throughout her time in the ninth grade. She ultimately had surgery to correct her spine.

While she was freshman at Yale University, she founded the Connecticut Scoliosis Association and wrote about her experiences with the disease in the book titled Scoliosis: Ascending the Curve. The book was published before she began classes at Yale in 1999.

While at Yale she majored in English literature and was a member of the "Arts and Letters" Manuscript Society.

Career
Lyons then became interested in acting, receiving her first speaking role in the Neil Simon play Rumors. She also worked in the productions The Maids and Heartbreak House. She received additional acting training at The Groundlings in Los Angeles.

Beginning in 2004, Lyons appeared in the television series American Dreams, That's So Raven, The Starter Wife, and Desperate Housewives, and has had recurring roles in 2 Broke Girls, The Affair, and Jane by Design.

In film, her most notable acting role to date was as Amy in the 2008 film Welcome Home Roscoe Jenkins. She also appeared in the films The Trap (2005), Protecting the King (2007), and Dark Reel (2008).

Personal life
In 2014, Lyons married film producer Max Osswald. She and Osswald have a son, born in August 2017.
Lyons co-starred in two films that Osswald produced, the short film To Sonnets and the television film A Deadly Adoption.

Filmography

References

External links
 
 

1980 births
21st-century American actresses
Actors from Fairfield, Connecticut
Actresses from New Haven, Connecticut
Actresses from Washington, D.C.
American film actresses
American television actresses
American people of Portuguese descent
American people of Irish descent
American people of Italian descent
Living people
Yale University alumni
Health activists